Richard Dix (born Ernst Carlton Brimmer; July 18, 1893 – September 20, 1949) was an American motion picture actor who achieved popularity in both silent and sound film. His standard on-screen image was that of the rugged and stalwart hero. He was nominated for the Academy Award for Best Actor for his lead role in the Best Picture-winning epic Cimarron (1931).

Early life
Dix was born on July 18, 1893, in Saint Paul, Minnesota.

He was educated there and, to please his father, studied to be a surgeon. His obvious acting talent in his school dramatic club led him to leading roles in most of the school plays. Standing 6 feet and weighing 180 pounds, Dix excelled in sports, especially football and baseball. After a year at the University of Minnesota, he took a position at a bank, and trained for the stage in the evening. His professional start was with a local stock company, and this led to similar work in New York City. He then went to Los Angeles and became leading man for the Morosco Stock Company. His success there earned him a contract with Paramount Pictures.

Career

He then changed his name to Richard Dix. After his move to Hollywood, he began a career in Western movies. One of the few leading men to successfully bridge the transition from silent films to talkies, Dix's best-remembered early role was in Cecil B. Demille's silent version of The Ten Commandments (1923). He was nominated for the Academy Award for Best Actor in 1931 for his performance as Yancey Cravat in Cimarron, in which he was billed over Irene Dunne. Cimarron, based on the popular novel by Edna Ferber, took the Best Picture award. Dix starred in another RKO adventure, The Lost Squadron.

A memorable role for Dix was in the 1935 British futuristic film The Tunnel. Dix starred in The Great Jasper and Blind Alibi in the late 1930s. His popular RKO Radio Pictures co-star in Blind Alibi was Ace the Wonder Dog. Dix's human co-stars were Whitney Bourne and Eduardo Ciannelli; the film was directed by Lew Landers. Dix also starred as the homicidal Captain Stone in the Val Lewton production of The Ghost Ship, directed by Mark Robson.

In 1941, Dix played Wild Bill Hickok in Badlands of Dakota and portrayed Wyatt Earp the following year in Tombstone, the Town Too Tough to Die, featuring Edgar Buchanan as Curly Bill Brocious.

In 1944, he starred in The Whistler, a feature film produced by Columbia Pictures based on the popular radio program. The film adaptation was popular enough to become a series. In these offbeat, crime-related stories, Dix did not play "The Whistler" (who was an unseen narrator representing the central character's conscience). He appeared in a variety of characterizations, some sympathetic, others hard-boiled, but always victims of fate and circumstances conspiring against him. Dix retired from acting after the seventh of these films, The Thirteenth Hour. He suffered a heart attack in October 1948 and continued to have heart trouble until his death within the year.

Hobbies
According to the July 1934 Movies magazine, on his ranch near Hollywood, the location of which he kept a close secret, Dix raised thousands of chickens and turkeys each year. He also had a collection of thousands of pipes, and a "collection" of 36 dogs, "Scotties and English setters". He also read at least five books a week.

Private life
Richard Dix married his first wife, Winifred Coe, on October 20, 1931. They had a daughter, Martha Mary Ellen. They divorced in 1933. He married his second wife, Virginia Webster, on June 29, 1934. They had twin boys, Richard Jr. and Robert Dix, and an adopted daughter, Sara Sue.

Dix supported Thomas Dewey in the 1944 United States presidential election.

Death
After years of fighting alcoholism, Dix suffered a serious heart attack on September 12, 1949, while on a train from New York to Los Angeles. Dix died at the age of 56 on September 20, 1949. He had four children from his two marriages. One of these was the actor Robert Dix (1935–2018). Richard Dix, Sr. was interred in Forest Lawn Memorial Park Cemetery in Glendale, California.

Recognition
Dix has a star on the Hollywood Walk of Fame in the Motion Pictures section at 1610 Vine Street. It was dedicated February 8, 1960.

Filmography

Silent Films

Sound films

Notes

References

Bibliography
 Dix, Robert. Out of Hollywood: Two Generations of Actors. Ernest Publishing, 2009. 
 Van Neste, Dan.  "The Whistler: Stepping Into the Shadows". Albany, GA: BearManor Media, 2011.

External links

 
 
 Richard Dix tribute site
 Photographs of Richard Dix

American male stage actors
University of Minnesota alumni
American male silent film actors
American male film actors
Male Western (genre) film actors
Male actors from Saint Paul, Minnesota
1893 births
1949 deaths
20th-century American male actors
Burials at Forest Lawn Memorial Park (Glendale)
Paramount Pictures contract players
RKO Pictures contract players